AIDS Care (subtitle: Psychological and Socio-medical Aspects of AIDS/HIV) is a peer-reviewed medical journal publishing HIV/AIDS research from multiple different disciplines, including psychology and sociology. It was established in 1989 and is published ten times per year by Taylor & Francis. The editor-in-chief is Lorraine Sherr (University College London). According to the Journal Citation Reports, the journal has a 2021 impact factor of 1.887.

References

External links

Taylor & Francis academic journals
Publications established in 1989
HIV/AIDS journals
English-language journals
10 times per year journals